Novopolotsk State Musical College is an undergraduate Belarusian music college established in 1968. Several of its graduates have gone on to have national and/or international musical careers.,

In 1997, the college opened a special department for talented children, providing individual progress for each child. The department often launches fund-raising programmes to continue its financing and development.

The college has eight departments, and subjects include musicology (leading to the qualification of professor), brass and percussion, piano, orchestral string instruments and chamber ensemble, chorus conducting, folk chorus, folk instruments (bayan, accordion) and string folk instruments.

It is currently directed by Alexander Ivanovich Kondratyuk. In its 40 years, it has produced over 2,000 students. Amongst its teachers are Galina Malykh, Marina Starostenkova and Mikhail Ivashkin.

Notable Graduates 
 Yulia Starostenkova, piano
 Vladislav Pligovka, accordion
 Tatjana Ivashkina, domra
 Mikhail Ivashkin,
 Arseni Sadykov, piano

References

External links 

Universities and colleges in Belarus
Educational institutions established in 1968